N. Kioleides is the largest Greek manufacturer of trailers (civilian and military) and truck bodies with successful exports to several countries. It was founded in 1968. A company division is exclusively responsible for the production of a large variety of railroad cars, passenger and freight with significant contracts with Hellenic Railways. In 1999 production started in the company's new modern factory in Volos.

In 2021 a company division signed an agreement with China's Zonson Smart Auto, regarding the licence production of electric trucks and buses in the company's factory in Volos.

Gallery

Sources 
 Home page
 Electric vehicles (company website)
 Agreement for vehicle manufacture (under Zonson license)

See also 
 List of companies in Greece

External links 
 L.S. Skartsis, Greek Vehicle & Machine Manufacturers 1800 to present: A Pictorial History, Marathon (2012)  (eBook)

Manufacturing companies of Greece
Rolling stock manufacturers of Greece
Vehicle manufacturing companies established in 1968
Defence companies of Greece

Greek brands
Greek companies established in 1968